Gang of Roses is a 2003 Western action drama film written and directed by Jean-Claude La Marre. It starred Monica Calhoun, Lil' Kim, LisaRaye, Charity Hill, Bobby Brown, Stacey Dash, Chrystale Wilson, and Marie Matiko. The movie took just 18 days to film.

The film followed by a sequel, Gang of Roses II: Next Generation (2012).

Plot
The film starts off with Left Eye Watkins (Brown) and his gang attempting to bully Sheriff Shoeshine Michel (Louis Mandylor) into giving them gold and women. A female member of the gang is extremely enthusiastic about the women and sets out to rape a can-can girl in the middle of town.  While resisting, the can-can cuts the female gang member who in turns shoots her in the middle of the road.

The can-can girl happens to be the sister of Rachel (Calhoun), the protagonist. Rachel, a religious, reformed bad girl, rounds up her former gang members, Kim (Dash), Zang Li (Makito), Chastity (Lil' Kim), Maria (LisaRaye), and Charlie (Wilson) to seek revenge. They are followed by a blacked haired lady (Gray) who is also seeking revenge upon Chastity.

Cast
 Monica Calhoun as Rachel
 Stacey Dash as Kim
 LisaRaye as Maria
 Marie Matiko as Zang Li
 Lil' Kim as Chastity
 Chrystale Wilson as Charlie
 Bobby Brown as Left Eye Watkins
 Louis Mandylor as Sheriff Shoeshine Michel
 Jacinto Taras Riddick as Georgy Simone
 Charity Hill as Little Suzie
 Glenn Plummer as Johnny Handsome
 Macy Gray as Black Haired Woman 
 Mario Van Peebles as Jessie Lee

References

External links
 

2003 films
2003 action films
2000s feminist films
2003 Western (genre) films
American independent films
African-American Western (genre) films
Films directed by Jean-Claude La Marre
2000s English-language films
2000s American films